Judge Madden may refer to:

Dodgson Hamilton Madden (1840–1928), judge of the Irish High Court
J. Warren Madden (1890–1972), judge of the United States Court of Claims
John Madden (judge) (1844–1918), Australian judge who became the longest-serving Chief Justice of Victoria
Ray Madden (1892–1987), municipal judge in Omaha, Nebraska, before serving in the United States Congress
Thomas M. Madden (1907–1976), judge of the United States District Court for the District of New Jersey